The Gandaulim Fort, also called the Gaudelupchar Fort was a military installation built on the eastern tip of the Ilhas de Goa. It is believed to date from the 16th-century. The fortress was allegedly built to defend the settlement of São Braz. It also housed a chapel dedicated to St. Blaise, which later was elevated into a church in 1563.

Demolition 
By the advent of the 21st century, the only remaining evidence of the fort consisted of its entrance gate and a few rundown walls. The gate was demolished by the government authorities, as part of a road expansion project, to widen the approach road to the Gandaulim-Cumbarjua ferry.

Gallery

See also
 Croatia–India relations
 Gandaulim

References

History of Goa
Forts in Goa
Colonial Goa
1537 establishments in India
Ragusan trade with India